Mieczysław Jan Wojczak (born 23 January 1951 in Chorzów) is a former Polish handball player who competed in the 1976 Summer Olympics and in the 1980 Summer Olympics.

In 1976 he won the bronze medal with the Polish team. He played one match as goalkeeper.

Four years later he was part of the Polish team which finished seventh. He played one match as goalkeeper again.

External links
profile 

1951 births
Living people
Polish male handball players
Handball players at the 1976 Summer Olympics
Handball players at the 1980 Summer Olympics
Olympic handball players of Poland
Olympic bronze medalists for Poland
Olympic medalists in handball
Sportspeople from Chorzów
Medalists at the 1976 Summer Olympics